The 1993 Air Canada Cup was Canada's 15th annual national midget 'AAA' hockey championship, which was played April 19 – 25, 1993 at the Kitchener Memorial Auditorium Complex in Kitchener, Ontario.  The Yorkton Mallers from Saskatchewan won the gold medal with a 5-4 overtime victory over the Gouverneurs de Ste-Foy.  The Sault Ste. Marie Legion took the bronze medal. Marty Turco of Sault Ste. Marie was named the Top Goaltender of the tournament.

Teams

Round robin

Standings

Scores

Kitchener 2 - Ste-Foy 2
Sault Ste. Marie 3 - Yorkton 2
Calgary 6 - Fredericton 5
Yorkton 3 - Kitchener 1
Ste-Foy 3 - Sault Ste. Marie 2
Calgary 5 - Kitchener 4
Sault Ste. Marie 3 - Fredericton 2
Ste-Foy 3 - Yorkton 0
Fredericton 7 - Kitchener 1
Sault Ste. Marie 4 - Calgary 1
Yorkton 8 - Calgary 4
Ste-Foy 3 - Fredericton 3
Sault Ste. Marie 8 - Kitchener 3
Ste-Foy 6 - Calgary 3
Fredericton 5 - Yorkton 5

Playoffs

Semi-final
(2) Yorkton 4 - (3) Sault Ste. Marie 1

Gold-medal game
(2) Yorkton 5 - (1) Ste-Foy 4 OT

Individual awards
Most Valuable Player: Martin Chouinard (Ste-Foy)
Top Scorer: David Reynolds (Fredericton)
Top Forward: David Reynolds (Fredericton)
Top Defenceman: Jim Drolet (Ste-Foy)
Top Goaltender: Marty Turco (Sault Ste. Marie)
Most Sportsmanlike Player: Jeremy Rebek (Sault Ste. Marie)

See also
Telus Cup

References

External links
Telus Cup Website
Hockey Canada-Telus Cup Guide and Record Book

Telus Cup
Air Canada Cup
Sport in Kitchener, Ontario
April 1993 sports events in Canada